Werner Conrad Clemm von Hohenberg (27 September 1897 - 14 April 1989, Biddeford, Maine) was born into a German family that married into German nobility, the Nazi Party and prominent American families. His father-in-law was a Vice President of Citibank. In 1922, Werner he immigrated to the United States. Prior to this he had served in the German army during World War I. He was a representative of the German international banking firm Hardy & Co. and an employee of the Pioneer Import Corp., which imported materials from Germany and handled his cousin and Nazi diplomat, Joachim von Ribbentrop's champagne business.  

Along with his twin brother, Carl Franz Clemm von Hohenberg, Werner had become friends with U.S. oil man, William Rhodes Davis. In the United States, Werner became Vice President of Davis' company Davis & Co., which shipped large quantities of oil to Germany and became a propaganda strategist and financial aid of the America First Committee, which encouraged American isolationism. 

In 1940 the Nazis seized large quantities of diamonds from Belgium and the Netherlands, which Werner was smuggling to the U.S. The United States was neutral and did not declare war until December 1941. To avoid detection he moved the diamonds through various European cities, shipped them to South America and they eventually found their way to New York City. The operation was stumbled upon by mistake by agents of the Treasury Department when they searched a Budweiser beer box being carried by two American soldiers of German descent. On inspection of the box they found it had a false bottom under which were one hundred letters and government bonds. The letters detailed Werner's diamond smuggling operation. After further investigation, von Clemm was arrested on 28 January 1942. He was convicted of conspiracy to import under false declarations, for which he received the maximum sentence of two years in prison and a $10,000 fine. An additional $10,000 fine was imposed on Pioneer Import Corp.. The judge said the diamonds were "stained with the blood of innocent people." Upon his release, Werner entered private banking.

He was also an agent of the German intelligence agency, Abwehr, and was involved in espionage during World War II.

His son Michael von Clemm went on to become a leading American banker who was involved in Western banking operations in Africa and helped found Canary Wharf.

References

1897 births
1989 deaths
American collaborators with Nazi Germany
American prisoners and detainees
American smugglers
German Army personnel of World War I
German emigrants to the United States
World War II spies for Germany

Prisoners and detainees of the United States federal government